Advocacy and incitement are two categories of speech, the latter of which is a more specific type of the former directed to producing imminent lawless action and which is likely to incite or produce such action. In the 1957 case Yates v. United States, Justice John Marshall Harlan II ruled that only advocacy that constituted an "effort to instigate action" was punishable. 

In the 1969 case Brandenburg v. Ohio, the U.S. Supreme Court ruled that a statute that punishes mere advocacy and forbids, on pain of criminal punishment, assembly with others merely to advocate the described type of action, falls within the condemnation of the First and Fourteenth Amendments. Justice Louis Brandeis argued in Whitney v. California that "even advocacy of violation, however reprehensible morally, is not a justification for denying free speech where the advocacy falls short of incitement and there is nothing to indicate that the advocacy would be immediately acted on."

References 

Freedom of speech
First Amendment to the United States Constitution